Monstrotyphis teramachii is a species of sea snail, a marine gastropod mollusk in the family Muricidae, the murex snails or rock snails.

References

Monstrotyphis
Gastropods described in 1964